The blotched mogurnda (Mogurnda spilota) is a species of fish in the family Eleotridae endemic to Lake Kutubu.

References

Mogurnda
Freshwater fish of Papua New Guinea
Taxonomy articles created by Polbot
Fish described in 1986